Arkaroola Protection Area is a protected area located about  north of the Adelaide city centre in the Australian state of  South Australia.  It was established in 2012 by the Arkaroola Protection Act 2012 "to provide for the proper management and care of the area; and to prohibit mining activities in the area".  The protection area is reported as satisfying the definition of a "category II National Park".

Extent
The former of the two leases which has not been stocked for over 30 years is operated for the purpose of conservation and tourism under the name, Arkaroola Wilderness Sanctuary.

History 
Following the public outcry that resulted from Marathon Resources' misconduct in the Arkaroola Wilderness Sanctuary—including the illegal dumping of many tonnes of exploration waste in shallow pits, the South Australian government promised to introduce legislation to ban all mining activities in the sanctuary, with the Premier stating that "we have decided to give the region unprecedented protection".

The protection enacted by the South Australian government prohibits any and all mining within an area roughly coincident with the Arkaroola pastoral lease on which the Arkaroola Wilderness Sanctuary is located. This area includes Mount Gee and the Mount Painter inlier.

See also
 Vulkathunha-Gammon Ranges National Park

References

External links 
Arkaroola protection area description and definition from Primary Industries and Resources, Government of South Australia

Protected areas of South Australia
Protected areas established in 2012
2012 establishments in Australia
Far North (South Australia)